Asteas (active between 350 and 320 BC in Paestum, Southern Italy) was one of the more active ancient Greek vase painters in Magna Graecia, practicing the red-figure style. He managed a large workshop, in which above all hydriai and kraters were painted. He painted mostly mythological and theatrical scenes. He is one of the few vase painters of the Greek colonies whose name comes down to us.

Selected works
Berlin, Antikensammlung
Calyx krater F 3044 
Kassel, Staatliche Museen
Skyphos
Malibu, J. Paul Getty Museum
Calyx krater 81.AE.78 (2006 als Fund aus einer Raubgrabung an Italien zurückgegeben) 
Paris, Musée National du Louvre
Lekanis K 570 
Tampa, Tampa Museum of Art
Hydria 89.98

References

 Arthur Dale Trendall. The red-figured vases of Paestum. Rome: British School, 1987.
 Erika Simon. Ein neuer signierter Kelchkrater des Asteas. In: Numismatica e antichità classiche. Quaderni ticinesi 31 (2002) 115-127.
 Erika Simon. The Paestan painter Asteas. In: Greek vases. Images, contexts and controversies. Proceedings of the conference sponsored by the Center for the Ancient Mediterranean at Columbia University, 23–24 March 2002 (Leiden 2004), p. 113-122.

4th-century BC Greek people
Ancient Greek vase painters
People from the Province of Salerno
Lucanian Greeks
Artists of Magna Graecia